Treasure Island Music Festival is an annual two-day music festival. Prior to 2018, the festival took place on Treasure Island, California, located in the San Francisco Bay. In 2018, the festival moved to Middle Harbor Shoreline Park, located in Oakland. The festival is produced by Noise Pop and Another Planet Entertainment (APE) .

The first day of the festival consists of electronica and hip hop/rap influenced performers while the second day consists of rock and indie rock influenced performers. Each day the sets are split between two separate, nearby stages, however, the performances are staggered such that attendees can listen to every performer. Typically, the northernmost stage is the main stage on which the headliner plays.

Parking on the island was limited and as such, each year the majority of private vehicles were left in the parking lot at AT&T Park or Bill Graham Auditorium, depending on the year, and a shuttle service was provided to the island. The organizers also claim this reduces traffic congestion on the island. The Treasure Island Music Festival has also been noted for its emphasis on reducing carbon emissions: organizers provide zero emission bus services to the island from the city of San Francisco and emphasize the use of composting.

This festival has been on hiatus since 2019.

2018 Lineup

Day 1: October 13
A$AP Rocky
Silk City (Diplo + Mark Ronson)
Santigold
Pusha T
Aminé
Hiatus Kaiyote
Laff Trax (Toro y Moi x Nosaj Thing)
Moses Sumney
Polo & Pan
George Fitzgerald (LIVE)
JPEGMAFIA
Gilligan Moss

Day 2: October 14
Tame Impala
Lord Huron
Courtney Barnett
Jungle
Sharon Van Etten
Cigarettes After Sex
U.S. Girls
Alex Cameron
Soccer Mommy
Pond
Shame
serpentwithfeet

2016 Lineup

Day 1: October 15
Ice Cube
ZHU
Glass Animals 
Duke Dumont—cancelled due to unsafe playing conditions 
Young Thug 
Flight Facilities—cancelled due to unsafe playing conditions
The Polish Ambassador—played extended set. 
Mura Masa
How to Dress Well— played a shortened set due to flight delays. 
Honne
Sofi Tukker
Kamaiyah—played twice.
DJ Worthy

Day 2: October 16
Sigur Ros 
James Blake—cancelled and performed a free show the following night.
Purity Ring 
Tycho—played a DJ set in addition to live performance. 
Mac DeMarco 
Sylvan Esso
Neon Indian 
Christine and the Queens 
Wild Nothing 
Deafheaven 
Car Seat Headrest 
Hinds
Day Wave

2015 Lineup

Day 1: October 17 
 deadmau5
 FKA twigs
 Big Grams (Big Boi and Phantogram)
 STS9
 Run The Jewels
 Gorgon City
 Hudson Mohawke
 Cashmere Cat
 Viceroy
 Shamir
 Bob Moses
 Skylar Spence
 Baio

Day 2: October 18 
 The National
 CHVRCHES
 The War On Drugs
 Father John Misty
 Panda Bear
 Jose Gonzalez
 Deerhunter
 Drive Like Jehu
 Ex Hex
 Mikal Cronin
 Lower Dens
 Viet Cong
 Ought

2014 Lineup

Day 1: October 18
 Outkast
 Zedd
 Janelle Monáe
 St. Lucia
 Jungle
 MØ
 Classixx
 Ryan Hemsworth
 Ana Tijoux
 XXYYXX
 Ratking
 Tobacco
 Painted Palms

Day 2: October 19
 Massive Attack
 alt-J
 TV on the Radio
 The New Pornographers
 Washed Out
 Banks
 Poliça
 The Growlers
 Chet Faker
 Ásgeir
 Bleached
 Cathedrals

2013 Lineup

Day 1: October 19
 Atoms for Peace
 Major Lazer
 Little Dragon
 Phantogram
 Disclosure
 Holy Ghost!
 Danny Brown
 DJ Falcon
 Poolside
 Adult.
 Robert DeLong
 Giraffage
 Antwon

Day 2: October 20
 Beck
 Animal Collective
 James Blake
 Sleigh Bells
 STRFKR
 Lord Huron
 Japandroids
 Real Estate
 Haim
 Palma Violets
 Cayucas
 IO Echo
 Deep Sea Diver

2012 Lineup

Day 1: October 13
Girl Talk
The Presets
Porter Robinson
Public Enemy
SBTRKT
Tycho
AraabMuzik
Matthew Dear
Toro y Moi
Grimes
The Coup
K.Flay
Dirty Ghosts

Day 2: October 14
The xx
M83
Gossip
Best Coast
Joanna Newsom 
Divine Fits
Youth Lagoon
Los Campesinos!
The War on Drugs
Ty Segall
Hospitality
Imperial Teen
The Neighbourhood

2011 Lineup

Day 1: October 15
Empire of the Sun
Cut Copy
Chromeo
Death From Above 1979
Battles
Dizzee Rascal
Flying Lotus
Yacht
The Naked & Famous
Aloe Blacc
Shabazz Palaces
Buraka Som Sistema
 Geographer

Day 2: October 16
Death Cab For Cutie
Explosions In The Sky
Beach House
The Hold Steady
The Head and the Heart
St. Vincent
Stephen Malkmus and the Jicks
Friendly Fires
Wild Beasts
Warpaint
The Antlers
Thee Oh Sees
Weekend

2010 Lineup

Day 1: October 16
LCD Soundsystem
Deadmau5
Kruder & Dorfmeister (Live set)
Miike Snow
!!!
Die Antwoord
Little Dragon
Four Tet
Holy Fuck
Phantogram
Jamaica
Wallpaper
Maus Haus

Day 2: October 17
Belle & Sebastian
The National
Broken Social Scene
She & Him
Superchunk
Rogue Wave
Surfer Blood
Ra Ra Riot
Monotonix
The Sea and Cake
Phosphorescent
Papercuts
The Mumlers

2009 Lineup

Day 1: October 17
MGMT
MSTRKRFT
Girl Talk
Brazilian Girls
The Streets
Passion Pit
LTJ Bukem Feat. MC Conrad
DJ Krush
Federico Aubele
Dan Deacon
Murs
Crown City Rockers
The Limousines

Day 2: October 18
The Flaming Lips
The Decemberists
Beirut
Grizzly Bear
Yo La Tengo
The Walkmen
Bob Mould
Thao with The Get Down Stay Down
Vetiver
Spiral Stairs
Sleepy Sun
Tommy Guerrero
Edward Sharpe and the Magnetic Zeros

2008 Lineup

Day 1: September 20
Justice
TV On The Radio
Goldfrapp
Hot Chip
Cansei de Ser Sexy
Antibalas
Aesop Rock
Amon Tobin
Foals
Mike Relm
Nortec Collective
Loquat
Chester French
The Frail

Day 2: September 21
The Raconteurs
Tegan and Sara
Vampire Weekend
Spiritualized
Okkervil River
Tokyo Police Club
The Kills
Dr. Dog
John Vanderslice
The Dodos
Fleet Foxes
The Morning Benders
Port O'Brien
Or The Whale

2007 Lineup

Day 1: September 15
Thievery Corporation
Gotan Project
DJ Shadow
Cut Chemist
M.I.A.
Ghostland Observatory
Kinky
Zion I
Kid Beyond
Dengue Fever
West Indian Girl
Mocean Worker
Honeycut.

Day 2: September 16
Modest Mouse
Spoon
Built to Spill
Clap Your Hands Say Yeah
M. Ward
Two Gallants
Earlimart
Au Revoir Simone
Film School
The Devil Makes Three
Sea Wolf
Street to Nowhere
Trainwreck Riders

See also

 Coachella Valley Music and Arts Festival
 Bonnaroo Music Festival
 Outside Lands Music and Arts Festival
List of electronic music festivals

Notes

External links

Official website
Satellite Map of Treasure Island, CA

Festivals in the San Francisco Bay Area
Music festivals in California
Electronic music festivals in the United States
Rock festivals in the United States
Music festivals established in 2007
2007 establishments in California